The dramatic episodes in which Greek mythology character Medea plays a role have ensured that she remains vividly represented in popular culture.

Literature 
 In Cicero's court case Pro Caelio, the name Medea is mentioned several times, as a way to make fun of  Clodia, sister of Publius Clodius Pulcher, the man who exiled Cicero.
 In the 15th-century Italian Arthurian romance La Tavola Ritonda, Medea lives on as the marvelously beautiful mistress of the island Perfida's Cruel Castle (Castello Crudele) in which she imprisons the hero Tristano (Tristan), as "every year she wanted to bent a [different] knight to her pleasure" for she was "the most lecherous woman in the world". Tristano, faithful to his true love Isolda, manages to escape from Medea's magic castle.
 Jean Anouilh, Médée (1946)
 John Gardner, Jason and Medeia
 Robinson Jeffers, Medea
 Hans Henny Jahnn, Medea
 Maxwell Anderson, The Wingless Victory
 Geoffrey Chaucer, The Legend of Good Women (1386)
 Michael Wood, In Search of Myths & Heroes: Jason and the Golden Fleece
 Chrysanthos Mentis Bostantzoglou (Bost), Medea (parody of Medea of Euripides)
Regina Hansen Willman, Music for Medea
 Robert Graves, Hercules, My Shipmate (novel by the English classicist, 1945)
 Peter Kien, Medea, a play written while Kien was an inmate at the Theresienstadt concentration camp and never performed.
 Medea (Ovid's lost tragedy - two lines are extant)
 Marina Carr, By the Bog of Cats
 A. R. Gurney, The Golden Fleece
 Pierre Corneille, Médée (tragedy, 1635)
 Ernest Legouvé, Médée (1855)
 William Morris Life and Death of Jason (epic poem, 1867)
 Franz Grillparzer, Das goldene Vliess (The Golden Fleece) (play, 1822)
 Dorothy M. Johnson, Witch Princess (novel, 1967)
 Otar Chiladze, A Man Was Going Down the Road (novel, 1973)
 Chico Buarque and Paulo Pontes, Gota d'Água (musical play set in 1970s Rio de Janeiro, based on Euripides, 1975)
 Heiner Müller, Medeamaterial  and Medeaplay
 Kate Braverman, Lithium for Medea, 1979
 Percival Everett, For Her Dark Skin (novel, 1990)
 H. M. Hoover, The Dawn Palace: The Story of Medea (novel, 1988)
 Christa Wolf, Medea (a novel) (Medea: Stimmen) (published in German 1993, translated to English 1998)
 Cherríe Moraga, The Hungry Woman: A Mexican Medea (combines classical Greek myth Medea with Mexicana/o legend of La Llorona and Aztec myth of lunar deity Coyolxauhqui)
 Stuart Hill, Blade Of Fire (Character portrayed as based on Medea in this Young adult novel)
 Rick Riordan, The Lost Hero;  Medea, having been resurrected by vengeful goddess Gaea (Mother Earth), runs a department store in Chicago. She appears again in The Burning Maze and is shown to work under Caligula. 
 Kerry Greenwood, Medea: Book III in the Delphic Women Series (1997) a retelling of the Jason and the Argonauts epic, focusing on the Princess and Priestess, Medea of Colchis.
 Dea Loher, Manhattan Medea (1999) in German; play set in modern-day Manhattan; Medea and Jason are living as illegal immigrants, until Jason marries the daughter of a rich businessman, abandoning Medea and their child; the play takes place on their wedding night.
 Jan Siegel, "The Dragon Charmer" (2000) A side note in an epic trilogy about witchcraft, sorcery, and magic.
Laurent Gaudé, "Médée Kali" (2003).
 David Vann, "Bright Air Black" (2017) retells Medea's story in prose poetry from a third person perspective. It is both lyrical and mired in Bronze Age realism.
Madeline Miller, Circe (2018) narrates Medea's visit to her aunt Circe to be cleansed for the killing of her brother.
 Ben Morgan, 'Medea in Corinth' (2018) is a sequence of poems and dramatic interludes which focus on Medea's religious encounter with Hecate. It includes a sonnet sequence composed of letters to Creusa, her love rival, illuminating their relationship.<http://poetrysalzburg.com/medea.htm>

Art 

 John William Waterhouse depicted Jason and Medea in Jason and Medea (painting).
 Thomas Satterwhite depicted Margaret Garner, an enslaved woman who killed two of her children to spare them from slavery, in The Modern Medea (painting).

Music 
 Francesco Cavalli Giasone (opera, 1649)
 Jean-Baptiste Lully Thésée (opera, 1674)
 Louis-Nicholas Clerambault composed a cantata for soprano, violin and continuo, called Médée, and was first published in 1710.
 Antonio Caldara Medea in Corinto  (cantata for alto, 2 violins and basso continuo, 1711)
 Marc-Antoine Charpentier Médée (tragédie en musique, 1693)
 In George Frideric Handel's opera Teseo [Theseus], 1713, the central character is Medea.
 Georg Anton Benda composed the melodrama Medea in 1775 on a text by Friedrich Wilhelm Gotter.
 Luigi Cherubini composed the opera Médée in 1797 and it is Cherubini's best-known work, but better known by its Italian version, Medea. A lost aria, which Cherubini apparently smudged out in spite more than 200 years ago, was revealed by x-ray scans.
 Simon Mayr composed his opera Medea in Corinto to a libretto of Giuseppe Felice Romani. It premiered in Naples in 1813.
 Saverio Mercadante composed his opera Medea in 1851 to a libretto by Salvadore Cammarano.
 Darius Milhaud composed the opera Médée in 1939 to a text by Madeleine Milhaud (his wife and cousin).
 American composer Samuel Barber wrote his Medea ballet (later renamed The Cave of the Heart) in 1947 for Martha Graham and derived from that Medea's Meditation & Dance of Vengeance Op. 23a in 1955.  The musical Blast! uses an arrangement of Barber's Medea as their end to Act I.
 Ray E. Luke's Medea won the 1979 Rockefeller Foundation/New England Conservatory Competition for Best New American Opera.
 Jacob Druckman's 1980 orchestral work, Prism, is based on three different renderings of the Medea myth by Charpentier, Cavalli, and Cherubini. Each movement incorporates material and quotations from the music of Druckman's three predecessors. At the time of his death, Druckman was writing a large-scale grand opera on the Medea myth commissioned by the Metropolitan Opera.
 Star of Indiana—the drum and bugle corps that Blast! formed out of—used Parados, Kantikos Agonias, and Dance of Vengeance in their 1993 production (with Bartók's Allegro from Music for Strings, Percussion and Celeste), between Kantikos and Vengeance.
 In 1993 Chamber Made produced an opera Medea composed by Gordon Kerry, with text by Justin Macdonnell after Seneca.
 Aribert Reimann's composed an opera Medea, which premiered in 2011 at the Vienna State Opera directed by Marco Arturo Marelli with Marlis Petersen in the title role.
 Michael John LaChiusa scored Marie Christine, a Broadway musical with heavy opera influence based on the story of Medea. The production premiered at the Vivian Beaumont Theater in December 1999 for a limited run under Lincoln Center Theater. LaChuisa's score and book were nominated for a Tony Award in 2000, as was a tour-de-force performance by six-time Tony winner Audra McDonald.
 In 1991, the world premiere was held in the Teatro Arriaga, Bilbao of the opera Medea by Mikis Theodorakis.  This was the first in Theodorakis' trilogy of lyrical tragedies, the others being Electra and Antigone.
 Oscar Strasnoy's opera Midea (2), based on Irina Possamai's libretto, premiered in 2000 at Teatro Caio Melisso, Spoleto, Italy. Orpheus Opera Award.
 Rockettothesky medea 2008
 instrumental chamber music piece Medea by Dietmar Bonnen 2008
 Dutch progressive rock band Kayak, with the song "Medea", on their 2008 release  Coming Up For Air
 Dutch one-man project Spinvis, with the song "Medea", in his album Goochelaars & Geesten in 2007
 Vienna Teng, with the song "My Medea" on her 2004 album Warm Strangers.
 The Finnish melodic death metal band Insomnium has a song about her called "Medeia" on their album In the Halls of Awaiting, which was released in 2002.
 Greek epic metal band Battleroar has a song named "The Curse of Medea" in their 2014 album Blood of Legends.
 Mauro Lanza composed the music to Le Songe De Médée, a ballet choreographed by Angelin Prelijocaj for the Ballet de l'Opéra national de Paris and featured in the film La Danse.
 Alina Novikova (composer) and Daria Zholnerova, produced an opera Medea, based on Innokentiy Annenskiy, Evripid's translation. First performed in 2011, St. Petersburg, Russia
 The southern metal band The Showdown has a song called "Medea - One Foot In Hell" on their album Back Breaker, which was released in 2008.
 English National Opera produced a UK premier staging of Charpentier's opera Médée in 2013. Director, David McVicar, Médée, Sarah Connolly
 In 2014, Dutch symphonic/progressive metal band Ex Libris released their second album Medea. It is a concept album which tells the tragic story of Medea.
 Eleni Karaindrou's album Medea (2014, ECM), composition for lavta, ney, clarinets, violoncello, santouri, bendir, and choir
 The Hanslick Rebellion : song Medea my Mistress, from the album the rebellion is here (2005).

Cinema and television 

 In the 1963 film Jason and the Argonauts, Medea was portrayed by Nancy Kovack. Here she is a Temple Dancer who Jason saves after her ship sinks, causing her to help him.
 In 1969, the Italian director Pier Paolo Pasolini directed a film adaptation of Medea featuring the opera singer Maria Callas in the title role.
 In 1978, the film A Dream of Passion in which Melina Mercouri as an actress portraying Medea seeks out Ellen Burstyn, a mother who recently murdered her children.
 In 1988, director Lars von Trier filmed his Medea for Danish television, using a pre-existing script by filmmaker Carl Theodor Dreyer. Cast included Udo Kier, Kirsten Olesen, Henning Jensen, and Mette Munk Plum.
 In the 1992 film Highway to Hell, Medea was portrayed by Anne Meara.
 In the 2000 Hallmark presentation Jason and the Argonauts, Medea was portrayed by Jolene Blalock.
 In the 2002 biopic of Mexican artist Frida Kahlo, Diego Rivera's previous wife Lupe Marín (played by Valeria Golino) and Frida Kahlo (played by Salma Hayek) talk of Lupe's response to Diego's infidelity. In response, Frida points a knife in a non-threatening gesture at Lupe, and calls her "Medea".
 In the 2005 film L'enfer (Hell) a student Anne (Marie Gillain) takes a formal oral exam on the subject of Medea. Her words are spoken over images of her sister Sophie (Emmanuelle Béart) playing with her two children implying an analogy.
 In the 2004 visual novel as well as the anime adaptations of Fate/stay night, Medea appears as a relatively major character under the title of Caster.
 In 2005, director Theo van Gogh created 6-part miniseries, moving Medea to Dutch politics.
 In 2007, director Tonino De Bernardi filmed a modern version of the myth, set in Paris and starring Isabelle Huppert as Medea, called Médée Miracle. The character of Medea lives in Paris with Jason, who leaves her.
 In 2009, Medea was shot by director Natalia Kuznetsova. Film was created by the tragedy of Seneca in a new-for-cinema genre of Rhythmodrama, in which the main basis of acting and atmosphere is music written before shooting.
 In the 2013 television series Atlantis, Medea is portrayed by Scottish actress Amy Manson.
 In the 2015 television series Olympus, Medea is portrayed by actress Sonita Henry.
 In 2016, Olivia Sutherland plays Medea in the MacMillan Films staging of Euripides classic.
 Between June and August 2016 the Cuban Broadcasting Radio Progreso presented the 60 chapters series The Mark of Medea written by Orelvis Linares and directed by Alfredo Fuentes. In the series two women, played by the actresses Arlety Roquefuentes and Rita Bedias, commits crimes inspired by the myth of Medea. This first of them castrates his lover in revenge by his treason. The second one drowns her own four year daughter in a pond because the baby disturbed her plans of living with her lover.

Theatre 
 Helen McCrory played Medea in the Royal National Theatre's acclaimed production in 2014.
 Hannah Shepherd-Hulford played Medea in the Lost Dog dance-theatre production of Ruination at the Royal Opera House in 2022.

Video games 

 Liquid Entertainment's 2008 video game Rise of the Argonauts portrays Medea as a dark sorceress and a defector from a cult of Hecate-worshiping assassins.
 Summoned as Servant Caster in mobile game Fate/Grand Order in two variants: as an adult who experienced Jason's betrayal already and as a young teen in the time of her just meeting Jason called "Medea Lily". In the stories of Fuyuki, Older Medea is darkened and has become an antagonist, while in the Okeanos storyline, where her younger self lies with Jason in the ship, Argo, she is both the protagonist and the antagonist.
 The Persona of Chidori Yoshino in Atlus’ 2006 release, the fourth game in the Persona (series) video game series; “Persona 3” and its subsequent rereleases (FES and Portable). In the game she is portrayed with the skull of a ram and curly yellow hair, most likely representing her involvement in the story of the golden fleece.

References

Classical mythology in popular culture
Medea